João Miguel Ribeiro Vigário (born 20 November 1995 in Gondomar, Porto District) is a Portuguese professional footballer who plays for F.C. Paços de Ferreira mainly as a winger.

References

External links

Portuguese League profile 

1995 births
Living people
People from Gondomar, Portugal
Sportspeople from Porto District
Portuguese footballers
Association football defenders
Association football wingers
Primeira Liga players
Liga Portugal 2 players
S.C. Salgueiros players
Vitória S.C. B players
Vitória S.C. players
G.D. Estoril Praia players
C.D. Tondela players
C.D. Nacional players
F.C. Paços de Ferreira players
Portugal youth international footballers